Angelo F. Coniglio (born August 21, 1936) is an American civil engineer, educator, genealogist and author.  He was in the first graduating class (BSCE,1961) of the School of Civil Engineering established by Robert L. Ketter at the University of Buffalo (UB) in 1956.  He also earned a master's degree from UB (MSCE, 1970).

As a civil engineer, he is an expert in the hydrology and water levels of the U. S. Great Lakes, and is credited, along with his team on the Lake Erie Wastewater Management Study at the Buffalo District of the U. S. Army Corps of Engineers, with the development of a plan that helped restore Lake Erie to more pristine conditions in the 1970s.  He is an expert in Lake Erie ice formation and management.  He taught as an adjunct professor in Civil Engineering at UB for twenty-five years, receiving the New York State Society of Professional Engineers' Engineering Educator of the Year award in 1993.

After his retirement from the engineering field, Coniglio, a first-generation Sicilian American brought up on the East Side and then the West Side of Buffalo, became an experienced genealogist, researching the Sicilian origins of his own family (from Serradifalco, Sicily), and numerous others.  His experiences in researching and traveling to Sicily led to his authorship of the book The Lady of the Wheel (La Ruotaia), which tells of the lives of poor Sicilian foundlings and sulfur miners in the late 1800s in Racalmuto, Sicily.  Since 2017, Coniglio has been a technical consultant on foundlings for Henry Louis Gates Jr.'s PBS television series Finding Your Roots.

Coniglio writes genealogy columns for several monthly magazines and Italian/Sicilian American newsletters, and gives frequent lectures on the topic.   In 2013 he received a first-place NAMPA award for his column "Breaking Down the 1930 Census: The Search for Our Ancestry" in the monthly magazine Forever Young.  He also writes for L'Italo Americano, a U.S. West Coast bilingual weekly.  Coniglio is currently working on his first full-length novel, to be entitled The Mountain of the Hawk (La Serra del Falcone), a fictional account based on the history of his ancestral town of Serradifalco and its inhabitants.  He has web pages devoted to Sicilian genealogical records, foundlings, and the Sicilian language.

Coniglio has been a vocal social and sports activist.  In the early 1970s, he brought a class action suit against the National Football League over its  policy of charging full regular-season prices for meaningless exhibition games mandatorily included in season-ticket packages.    The suit failed after being raised to the U. S. Supreme Court, prompting Coniglio to remark "I learned that the Anti-Trust laws don't protect the public from avaricious businessmen, they protect avaricious businessmen from each other!"

As an avid American Football League (AFL, 1960 - 1969) fan, Coniglio lobbied successfully to have the Kansas City Chiefs wear a ten-year AFL shoulder patch in the fourth and final AFL-NFL World Championship game.  He has been a proponent of wider appreciation of the American Football League and its players, lobbying for more AFL players to be inducted to the Pro Football Hall of Fame, and prompting Professional Football to acknowledge the legacy of the AFL during its fiftieth anniversary season in 2009.   He appeared in the 2009 Showtime television series Full Color Football: The History of the American Football League.  Coniglio's Remember the AFL website is among the most-referenced sites for information, images and statistics relating to the AFL. 
He is acknowledged as an expert on the history of the league, and lectures on the AFL and its influence on modern Professional Football.

Coniglio has lobbied strongly for greater recognition of Buffalo's role in the establishment of the Erie Canal, which established New York City as a major port.  He proposes an Ellis Island-inspired Buffalo Erie Canal Museum and Visitor's Center which would describe Buffalo's role as the Western Terminus of the Canal, and the nexus for the country's great western migration of pioneers.

He is a strong advocate for recognition of Sicilian heritage, actively writing and posting articles about the history of Sicily, its language and its contributions to world culture, which he maintains far outweigh negative elements often emphasized in popular media.  His love for Sicilian culture led him to become a minor investor in a full-length documentary film by author and producer Mark Spano.  The film, originally entitled 'Re-imagining Sicily', is 'Sicily: Land of Love and Strife'.  After its April 2018 world premiere in Spano's home town of Kansas City, Missouri, the film then went to its Canadian premiere in Hamilton, Ontario, on June 20.
Coniglio collaborated with Spano to present the film's East Coast premiere in Buffalo on June 25, 2018. The event was a sellout and required a second showing.  Coniglio remarked "Attendees saw a film that extolled the beauty and culture of Sicily, without the foolish glorification of criminal elements that has come to be expected in films about my homeland. I commend Mark Spano for creating such a film."

Coniglio's first language was Sicilian, and combining his experience as an educator and his knowledge of the language, in September 2021 he instituted Buffalo's first class in the Sicilian language, "Conversational Sicilian for Beginners" at the new location of the Buffalo Italian Cultural Center. Due to popular demand "Conversational Sicilian for Beginners - Part 2" is now also being offered  In January 2022, under Coniglio's direction, the Center intiated the CCI Genealogy Station, with on-line access to genealogy sites, and hands-on instruction to assist Buffalo's Sicilian and Italian Americans in tracing their ancestry.
 
Coniglio also led a successful fight to have the name of his alma mater retain its major reference to BUFFALO rather than 'New York' as proposed by now-departed UB Athletic Director Danny White, who had no ties to the Buffalo region.

He is a distant cousin of Indy car driver Al Loquasto, and of set designer Santo Loquasto.  All are descendants of Libertino lo Guasto, a foundling born in Serradifalco, Sicily in 1796.  He is also a cousin of Arizona Diamondbacks manager Torey Lovullo.   Coniglio and his wife Angela summer at their cottage on Crystal Beach Hill in Ontario, Canada.

Coniglio and his wife had two children, both of whom predeceased him.

References

External links 

 Bibliography

1936 births
American writers of Italian descent
21st-century American novelists
American civil engineers
American male novelists
American educators
American genealogists
Historians of Sicily
Historians of immigration to the United States
Living people
Writers from Buffalo, New York
American historical novelists
University at Buffalo alumni
21st-century American male writers
Novelists from New York (state)
21st-century American non-fiction writers
American male non-fiction writers
Engineers from New York (state)
Historians from New York (state)